Ur-Ningirsu I (Sumerian: , Ur-D-nin-gir-su), was a Sumerian ruler (ensi) of the state of Lagash in Southern Mesopotamia who ruled c. 2200 BCE. He is much less known and documented than Ur-Ningirsu II, generally just called Ur-Ningirsu.

The existence of Ur-Ningirsu I was proved by an inscription in the British Museum (an offering list, referenced BM 18474), in which he is called "Ur-Ningirsu the elder" (Ur-D-nin-gir-su gu-la), and is contrasted a few lines later by another ruler described as "Ur-Ningirsu, son of Gudea". He would be the son of Ur-Nin-MAR.KI according to the Lagash King List.

Ur-Ningirsu I is also known by a few year names:

His son was Pirig-me.

References

22nd-century BC Sumerian kings
Kings of Lagash